The men's high jump competition at the 1998 Asian Games in Bangkok, Thailand was held on 18 December at the Thammasat Stadium.

Schedule
All times are Indochina Time (UTC+07:00)

Results
Legend
NM — No mark

References

External links
Results

Men's high jump
1998